The term Electric bikes may refer to:

Electric motorcycles and scooters
Electric bicycles